Bolshoye is a rural locality (a village) in Staroselskoye Rural Settlement, Vologodsky District, Vologda Oblast, Russia. The population was 104 as of 2002.

Geography 
Bolshoye is located 66 km northwest of Vologda (the district's administrative centre) by road. Michkovo is the nearest rural locality.

References 

Rural localities in Vologodsky District